Abdullahi Ishaka (born 3 March 1984 in Lagos) is a Nigerian footballer.

Career
Before moving to Valkeakoski, the midfielder played for Albanian club KS Besa Kavajë which plays in Albanian Superliga.  Ishaka has also played in Nigeria U17 National soccer team and a few games in UEFA competitions. First two games with KF Partizani Tirana in the 2006–07 UEFA Intertoto Cup. In the season 2007-2008, he played three games in UEFA Cup qualifiers with KS Besa Kavajë and scored a goal against FK Bezanija.

International career
He is a former member of the Nigeria national under-17 football team.

References

1984 births
Living people
Nigerian footballers
Nigerian expatriate footballers
Nigeria youth international footballers
FK Partizani Tirana players
Besa Kavajë players
Nigerian expatriates in Albania
FC Haka players
Veikkausliiga players
Nigerian expatriates in South Africa
Expatriate footballers in Albania
Expatriate soccer players in South Africa
Expatriate footballers in Finland
Association football midfielders
Sportspeople from Lagos
21st-century Nigerian people